The Tohoku Medical Megabank Project is a national project in Japan. The mission of the Tohoku Medical Megabank (TMM) project is to carry out a long-term health survey in the Miyagi and Iwate prefectures, which were affected by the Great East Japan Earthquake, and provide the research infrastructure for the development of personalized medicine by establishing a biobank and conducting cohort studies. It started in 2012.

The TMM project is conducted by Tohoku University's Tohoku Medical Megabank Organization (ToMMo) and Iwate Medical University's Iwate Tohoku Medical Megabank Organization (IMM).

Projects 
The following cohort studies and research projects are in progress or completed.

Prospective cohort studies 

 Community-based cohort  (General population).
 Birth and Three-generation cohort.
 Biobanking and database.
 Return of results to participants (including genomic information).

Research projects 

 Whole genome sequencing with short read and long read technologies.
 SNP array Genotyping with Japonica array.
 Construction of Japanese human genome reference.
 Plasma metabolome analysis with NMR and Mass spectrometry.
 Proteome analysis.
 Transcriptome analysis.
 Epigenome analysis.
 Oral Microbiome analysis.

Timeline 
2013
 Recruitment of TMM Community-Based Cohort starts.
 Recruitment of TMM Birth and Three-Generation Cohort Study starts.
2014
 Japanese genome reference panel (1KJPN), which shows variant allele frequency based on whole genome sequencing of 1,070 cohort participants, is released (draft version 2014, official version 2015).
 Japonica array, a SNP array optimized for Japanese population by taking advantage of 1KJPN haplotype information, is released.
2015
 A portal site of Japanese Multi Omics Reference Panel (jMorp), providing metabolome and proteome data from the cohort participants, is opened. As of 2022, jMorp covers metabolome, proteome, transcriptome, methylome, as well as genome reference panel.
2016
 Recruitment of TMM Community-Based Cohort is finished with over 80,000 participants.
2017
 Recruitment of TMM Birth and Three-Generation Cohort Study is finished with over 70,000 participants.
 The second followup survey starts.
2018
 Japanese genome reference panel (3.5KJPNv2), which shows variant allele frequency based on whole genome sequencing of 3,554 cohort participants, is released (published in 2019).
2019
 Japanese reference genome (JG1) is released (published in 2021).
 Distribution of 67,000 TMM Community-Based Cohort samples data starts.
 Japanese genome reference panel (4.7KJPN) is released.
 Japonica array NEO, a SNP array optimized for Japanese population by taking advantage of 3.5KJPN haplotype information, is released (published in 2021).
2020
 Distribution of 54,000 SNP array data starts.
 Distribution of TMM Birth and Three-Generation Cohort samples data starts.
 Japanese genome reference panel (8.3KJPN) is released.
 Japanese reference genome (JG2) is released.
2021
 The third followup survey starts.
 Japanese genome reference panel (14KJPN) is released.
 JSV1, a structural variation panel, which is constructed with long-read sequencing data, is released.
2022

 Whole genome sequencing of 50,000 cohort participants was finished.
 Japanese genome reference panel (38KJPN) is released. Data is available through the portal site, jMorp.

References

External links 

 Tohoku Medical Megabank Organization
 Iwate Tohoku Medical Megabank Organization
 jMorp: Japanese Multi Omics Reference Panel
 iMETHYL: an integrative database of human DNA methylation, gene expression, and genomic variation.

Biobank organizations
Cohort studies
Medicine in Japan
2012 establishments in Japan
Tohoku University
Iwate University
Genetics databases